The M16 Multiple Gun Motor Carriage, also known as the M16 half-track, was an American self-propelled anti-aircraft weapon built during World War II. It was equipped with four .50 caliber (12.7 mm) M2 Browning machine guns in an M45 Quadmount. 2700 were produced by White Motor Company from May 1943 to March 1944, with 568 M13 MGMCs and 109 T10 half-tracks being converted into M16s as well.

The chassis was derived from the T1E2 chassis, an earlier version of the M13. Based on an M3 half-track chassis, it replaced the M13 MGMC half-track after early 1944. As aircraft became more advanced, the usefulness of the M16 was reduced. In the Korean War, it was relegated primarily to the ground-support role, being put out of service in the U.S. Army in 1954.

Nicknamed the "Meat Chopper", the M16 was famous for its effectiveness against low-flying aircraft and infantry, making it extremely popular with soldiers. It was used by the United States Army, the British Commonwealth, and South Korea. A similar version of the M16, the M17, was based on the M5 half-track and exported via Lend-Lease to the Soviet Union.

Specifications 
The specifications of the M16 were similar to those of the M3 half-track. It was 21 ft 4 in (6.5 m) long (with a wheelbase of ), 7 ft 1 in (2.16 m) wide, and 7 ft 8 in (2.34 m) high and weighed 9.9 short tons (9 t). It had suspension consisting of vertical volute spring suspension for the tracks and leaf springs for the wheels.

It was powered by a 128-horsepower (95 kW) White 160AX 386 cubic inch (6,300 cc) 6-cylinder gasoline engine. It had a compression ratio of 6.3:1 and a 60 US gallon (230 L) fuel tank. It could reach a top speed of 41.7 mph (67.1 km/h) and a range of 175 miles (282 km) and a power to weight ratio of 15.8 horsepower per tonne. It had a main armament of four 0.5 in (12.7 mm) machine guns in a M45 Quadmount and 12 millimeters of armor on the front and the sides.

Development 

The M16 was an improvement on the twin .50 caliber M2 Browning heavy machine gun equipped M13 MGMC and M14 MGMC (built on an M3 and M5 half-track chassis respectively). It was based on an earlier model of the M13 (the T1E2), but the M33 Maxson mount was replaced with the M45 Quadmount and the M2 half-track chassis was replaced by the M3 chassis.

This prototype was originally designated as the T61 MGMC, but after trials at Aberdeen it was accepted as the M16 Multiple Gun Motor Carriage. A few corrections were made on a pilot vehicle in early 1943 (including the addition of a gun shield) before production started.

A total of 2,877 were produced by the White Motor Company during the period from May 1943 to March 1944, while 568 M13s and 109 T10 half-tracks were also converted into M16s. Further production of the M13 and M14 was ceased in favor of production of the M16 and M17 (an M16 built on a M5 half-track chassis).

Service history 

The M16 MGMC entered service in early 1944, with the M13 taken out of action soon after. The M16 was nicknamed "The Meat Chopper" for its deadly firepower, and was extremely popular with troops. In addition to its anti-aircraft role, the M16 was used in an infantry support role, frequently accompanied by the M15 half-track. The M17 MGMC primarily served with the Soviet Union as part of Operation Bagration and a few other battles.

The M16 saw service with U.S. forces in the Italian Campaign, and Operation Overlord, the Battle of Arracourt, and the Ardennes Offensive in northern Europe. Small numbers were supplied to the United Kingdom and France under Lend-Lease. The vehicle was also used widely in the Korean War by the South Korean army, the United States Marine Corps, and the U.S. Army.

As aircraft became more advanced over the M16's lifetime, its role as a mobile anti-aircraft weapon became limited, and the newer M19 MGMC was more heavily-armed with more powerful and longer-range guns. During the Korean War, it served mainly in the ground-support role, at which it was highly effective. In late 1951, it was declared as "limited standard" and largely taken out of service from the U.S. Army in Korea, although a few examples served until the end of the war. It was declared obsolete by the U.S. Army in 1958.

Operators 
 : United States – United States Army, U.S. Marine Corps
 : United Kingdom – Two received through the Lend-Lease program
 : Free French Forces – Seventy received through the Lend-Lease program
  - the French Army still had 300 in service in 1984
 : Wehrmacht – Captured from the U.S.
 : Bundeswehr 1956 - 1962
 : Belgian Army – post-war use
 : Israel Defense Forces – few units during its early ages
 : Japan Ground Self-Defense Force – Lent by the U.S.
 : Philippine Army
 : Portuguese Army
 : Republic of Korea Army – Lent by the U.S.
 : Royal Thai Army – Still using in some Anti air unit
 : Royal Netherlands Army – Several bought from war dumps and used in the anti air units.

Variants 
 M16 – A T1E2 with a M45D quad-mount and a M3 half-track chassis.
 M16A1–  An M16 with a M3A1 half-track chassis equipped the M45F Quad-mount.
 M16A2 – M16s with the M45D quad-mount replaced with the M45F Quad-mount.
 M17 MGMC – M5 half-tracks with the M45F quad-mount supplied under Lend Lease to the USSR. A total of 1,000 were produced by International Harvester from December 1943 to March 1944. Up to half of the Soviet Union's air defense forces consisted of M17s.

See also 

 List of U.S. military vehicles by model number
 List of U.S. military vehicles by supply catalog designation

References

Notes

Citations

Bibliography
 Berndt, Thomas (1993). Standard  of U.S. Military Vehicles. Iola, WI: Krause Publications. 
 Berndt, Thomas (1994). American Tanks of World War II. Minnesota, MN: MBI Publishing Company. 
 Bowers, William T.; Greenwood, John T. (2011). Passing the Test: Combat in Korea, April–June 1951. Lexington, KY: University of Kentucky Press. 
 Chamberlain, Peter; Ellis, Chris (1969). British and American Tanks of World War II. New York, NY: Arco Publishing Inc. 
 Doyle, David (2011). Standard Catalog of U.S. Military Vehicles. (2nd Edition). Iola, WI: Krause Publications. 
 Green, Michael (2014). American Tanks & AFVs of World War II. Oxford, UK: Osprey Publishing. 
 Hunnicutt, R. P. (2010). Half-Track: A History of American Semi-Tracked Vehicles. Navato, CA: Presidio Press. 
 Ness, Leland (2002). World War II Tanks and Armored Fighting Vehicles. London, UK: Harper Collins. 
 Zaloga, Steven J. (2004). M3 Infantry Half-Track 1940–1973. Oxford, UK: Osprey Publishing.

External links

 M16 Multiple Gun Motor Carriage

Half-tracks of the United States
World War II armored fighting vehicles of the United States
World War II half-tracks
Self-propelled anti-aircraft weapons of the United States
Military vehicles introduced from 1940 to 1944